Mitromorpha hewitti is a species of sea snail, a marine gastropod mollusk in the family Mitromorphidae.

This species was originally named Mitromorpha volva var.  G.B. Sowerby III by E. Smith in the Journal of Malacology, xi, p. 31, pi. ii, f. 13, but Smith didn't describe it as distinct. J.R. Tomlin described it as Antimitra (?) hewitti but also indicated that the correct usage of the generic name Mitromorpha is pointed out in Proceedings of the Malacological Society of London, vol. xii, p. 32S,

Description
The length of the shell attains 7 mm, its diameter 2.75 mm.

(Original description) The ribs are broader, flatter, further apart than in Mitromorpha volva, and are more widely spaced on the upper half of the basal whorl than elsewhere. There are four ribs on the penultimate whorl, and sixteen to seventeen on the body whorl, as against five to seven and at least twenty-one respectively in volva. The interstices show distinct axial sculpture, consisting of fine raised lines very close together, with numerous more prominent ones occurring very irregularly. All the ribs on the last three whorls are more or less evidently and regularly spotted with brown. This is particularly noticeable on the peripheral rib, which is broader than the rest and traceable on the two whorls preceding the body whorl.

Distribution
This marine species was found off Port Alfred, South Africa.

References

 Tomlin, JR le B. "Six new marine shells from South Africa." Journal of Conchology 16.7 (1921): 215–217.
 Steyn, D.G. & Lussi, M. (1998) Marine Shells of South Africa. An Illustrated Collector’s Guide to Beached Shells. Ekogilde Publishers, Hartebeespoort, South Africa, ii + 264 pp. page(s): 156

External links
 
 

Endemic fauna of South Africa
hewitti
Gastropods described in 1921